MHHS may refer to:
 Mundaring and Hills Historical Society in Mundaring, Western Australia, Australia

Schools 
 Medicine Hat High School, Medicine Hat, Alberta, Canada
 Morris Hills High School, Rockaway, New Jersey, United States
 Mountain Home High School (Arkansas), Mountain Home, Arkansas, United States
 Mountain Home High School (Idaho), Mountain Home, Idaho, United States
 Mt. Hope High School, Bristol, Rhode Island, United States
 Mission Hills High School, San Marcos, California, United States
 Mountain House High School, Mountain House, California, United States